Richard Adu-Bobie (born 12 January 1985) is a Canadian sprinter. He was an alternate for Canada's 4 × 100 m relay team at the 2004 Summer Olympics. He was an alternate for the same team at the 2008 Summer Olympics.

Born in Manchester, New Hampshire to Ghanaian parents, Adu-Bobie moved to Canada at a young age and received his Canadian citizenship just two days prior to the Olympic trials. Adu-Bobie attended Sir Wilfrid Laurier Secondary School in Ottawa, Canada, where he first launched into his sprinting career.

Following the 2004 Olympics in Athens, Adu-Bobie went to the University of Florida where he placed third in the 60-yard dash at the NCAA Indoor Track and Field Championship. Unfortunately, that same spring, he injured his leg and had to miss most of the outdoor season. In 2006, Adu-Bobie transferred to Texas A&M.

Adu-Bobie has become an experienced international sprinter, competing in the NCAA Midwest Regional Championships, the Canadian Championships, the Pan Am Games and the 2005, and 2007 World Championships.  He is the former Canadian junior record holder in the 100 metres.

After graduating from Texas A&M University in College Station, Texas, he returned to Ottawa, where he currently resides.

Personal bests

All information from IAAF Profile.

References

External links

Biding his time in the starting blocks

1985 births
Living people
American emigrants to Canada
Athletes (track and field) at the 2004 Summer Olympics
Athletes (track and field) at the 2007 Pan American Games
Athletes from Ottawa
Black Canadian track and field athletes
Canadian male sprinters
Olympic track and field athletes of Canada
Sportspeople from Manchester, New Hampshire
People with acquired Canadian citizenship
Pan American Games track and field athletes for Canada
Canadian people of Ghanaian descent
Pan American Games medalists in athletics (track and field)
Pan American Games silver medalists for Canada
Medalists at the 2007 Pan American Games